The 2003 SEC women's basketball tournament took place March 6–9, 2003 in North Little Rock, Arkansas at Alltel Arena.

LSU won the tournament and received the SEC's automatic bid to the NCAA tournament by beating Tennessee on March 9, 2003 by the score of 78 to 62.

Tournament

Asterisk denotes game ended in overtime.

All-Tournament team 
 Shameka Christon, Arkansas
 Temeka Johnson, LSU (MVP)
 Seimone Augustus, LSU
 LaToya Thomas, Miss. State
 Kara Lawson, Tennessee

References

SEC women's basketball tournament
Sports in Little Rock, Arkansas
2003 in sports in Arkansas
College sports tournaments in Arkansas